The 1898–99 Scottish Division One season was won by Rangers by ten points over nearest rival Heart of Midlothian. Rangers won all 18 of their league matches.

League table

Results

References 

 Scottish Football Archive

1898–99 Scottish Football League
Scottish Division One seasons